is a town located in Miyaki District, Saga Prefecture, Japan on the island of Kyūshū. It can be considered part of an economic sphere with nearby cities Tosu in Saga Prefecture and Ogōri and Kurume in Fukuoka Prefecture. Approximately 10 percent of the population of Kiyama works or goes to school in the city of Fukuoka and as such Kiyama can be considered a part of the Fukuoka metropolitan area. It is also known as a commuter town for Kurume. As of March 1, 2017, the town has an estimated population of  17,398.

Geography
Kiyama is located on the eastern end of Saga Prefecture. It shares its southern border with Tosu and the rest of the town borders Fukuoka Prefecture.

Adjoining municipalities
Chikushino
Ogōri
Tosu

History
April 1, 1889 - The modern municipal system is established and the village of Kiyama is formed.
January 1, 1939 - Kiyama gains town status.

Education

Public schools
Kiyama Junior High School (基山町立基山中学校)
Kiyama Elementary School (基山町立基山小学校)
Wakaki Elementary School (基山町立若基小学校)

Private schools
Tōmeikan Junior and Senior High School

Transportation

Air
The closest airport is Fukuoka Airport.

Rail
JR Kyushu
Kagoshima Main Line
Keyakidai Station - Kiyama Station
Amagi Railway
Kiyama Station - Tateno Station

The main station is Kiyama Station.

Road
Expressways
Kyūshū Expressway
Kiyama Parking Area
There are no interchanges within the town's borders.
National highways
Route 3
Main prefectural roads
Tosu-Chikushi Route 17

Scenic and historic places
Kii Castle (National Historic Landmark)
Daikōzenji (in the later half of April and the early half of May about 50,000 azaleas are in bloom here)
Ryūkōtokuji, a temple of Shingon Buddhism
Araho-jinja, a Shinto shrine

References

External links

 Kiyama official website 

Towns in Saga Prefecture